Shaker Village may refer to:

(by state)
Pleasant Hill, Kentucky, home of Shaker Village of Pleasant Hill, listed on the National Register of Historic Places
Shaker Village (Sabbathday Lake, Maine), listed on the NRHP
Hancock Shaker Village, Hancock, Massachusetts, listed on the NRHP
Harvard Shaker Village Historic District, Harvard, Massachusetts, listed on the NRHP
Shirley Shaker Village, Shirley, Massachusetts, listed on the NRHP
Canterbury Shaker Village, Canterbury, New Hampshire, listed on the NRHP
Shaker Village Historic District (Shaker Heights, Ohio), listed on the NRHP